Lu Gongxun (born 1933) is a People's Republic of China citizen. He was born in Shuozhou, Shanxi. He was a delegate to the 8th National People's Congress and 9th National People's Congress.

References

1933 births
People's Republic of China politicians from Shanxi
Chinese Communist Party politicians from Shanxi
Delegates to the 8th National People's Congress
Delegates to the 9th National People's Congress
Living people
Politicians from Shuozhou